Rebinea is a genus of moths belonging to the family Tortricidae. It was described by Józef Razowski in 1986.

Species
 Rebinea brunnea Razowski & Pelz, 2010
 Rebinea erebina (Butler, 1883)

References

 , 1986, Sci. Nat 52: 22.
  2010: Tortricidae from Chile (Lepidoptera: Tortricidae). Shilap Revista de Lepidopterologia 38 (149): 5-55.

Euliini
Tortricidae genera
Taxa named by Józef Razowski